The Fauvel AV.45 was an unorthodox motor glider produced in France in the 1960s and 1970s. Like other Charles Fauvel designs, it was a tailless aircraft, in this case inspired by the work that German firms had done on producing motorised versions of his AV.36 design. The prototype of the AV.45 was an extensively modified AV.36 powered by a Nelson H-59 two-stroke engine. AV.45s have been built with a number of other engines, however, including at least one aircraft powered by a small turbojet (a Microturbo Eclair). Falconar marketed the plans in the 1970s.

Variants
 AV.45 - initial version
 AV.451 - version with increased span and refined aerodynamics
 AV.48 - planned fibreglass version (not built)

Specifications (AV 45)

References

 
 

Fauvel aircraft
1960s French sailplanes
Homebuilt aircraft
Motor gliders
Tailless aircraft
Aircraft first flown in 1960
Pusher aircraft
Single-engined pusher aircraft